

Season events
On 23 November, Gabriel Özkan signed a new two-year contract with AIK, keeping him at the club until the end of 2013.

Squad

Transfers

In

Loans in

Out

Loans out

Released

Friendlies

Competitions

Overview

Allsvenskan

League table

Results summary

Results by matchday

Results

Svenska Cupen

Squad statistics

Appearances and goals

|-
|colspan="16"|Players away on loan:

|-
|colspan="16"|Players who appeared for AIK but left during the season:

|}

Goal scorers

Clean sheets

Disciplinary record

References

AIK Fotboll seasons
AIK Fotboll season